The following is a list of Missouri State Bears football seasons for the football team that has represented Missouri State University in NCAA competition.

Seasons

References

Missouri State

Missouri State Bears football seasons